The British Rail Class 411 (4CEP) electric multiple units were built at Eastleigh works from 1956–63 for the newly electrified main lines in Kent. These units, which used a British Railways Mark 1 bodyshell, were based on the earlier Southern Railway 4 COR design, built in 1937. Variants of the class 411 design included the class 410 and class 412 4 BEP units, which contained a buffet car in place of a standard trailer. They were later used on services in Sussex and Hampshire; following the privatisation of British Rail in 1995, the units were used by the Connex South Central, Connex South Eastern and South West Trains franchises. They were replaced by Juniper, Desiro, and Electrostar units. The fleet's lifespan was 49 years. These units are the longest-lived BR Mark 1 EMUs.

Description 
A total of 133 units were built, as two different types. The majority of units were 'standard' passenger-only units, complemented by units containing a buffet car.

Standard units 
The standard units contained passenger seating only, and formed the backbone of the new fleet. 111 units were built in several batches, initially numbered in the range 7101-7211. Units 7101-7104 were the prototype units, and were followed by 'Phase 1' units (7105-7153) and subsequently 'Phase 2' units (7154-7211).

Units were formed of two outer driving motors cars with 2nd class (later Standard Class) seating in open saloons, sandwiching two intermediate trailer cars – one a corridor second and the other a First/Second corridor composite.

4 BEP units 
The 4 BEP units were similar to the standard units, but contained a buffet car in place of the second class open trailer. The buffet trailer had a dining room, a large kitchen pantry, and a buffet counter with some seats.

22 units were built, initially numbered in the range 7001-7022. The first two units (7001-7002) were prototypes, and were followed by 'Phase 1' units (7003-7012) and 'Phase 2' (7013-7022).

The 4 BEP fleet were classified as Class 410 by British Rail under the new computer numbering system introduced in 1968.

Vehicle numbering 
The numbering of individual vehicles and details of when units were built are shown in the table below.

Refurbishment 
During the late 1970s and early 1980s, British Rail recognised that the 4 CEP fleet was in need of refurbishment. This was carried out at BR's Swindon Works. Refurbishment included moving the guard's compartment from both the motor cars to one of the intermediate trailers. Many of the 4BEP fleet were converted to standard units, since the requirement for buffet cars had declined.

The first refurbished unit was no. 7153, which was later renumbered to 1500. This unit was experimentally refurbished in 1975 at Eastleigh Works. Following evaluation, the contract for the refurbishment of the rest of the fleet was awarded to BR's Swindon Works. At the same time, units were renumbered from their original sequence into the later BR standard system reflecting TOPS class and sub-class, though in Southern Region style, only the last four digits were carried - so for example 411 501 was abbreviated to 1501. Units were renumbered in order of refurbishment, not reflecting their original numerical order.  Subsequent refurbished standard units were renumbered in the range 1501–1621, and reclassified as Class 411/5. Only seven 4 BEP units were retained and refurbished, being renumbered in the range 2301–2307, and reclassified as Class 412/3. The remaining 4BEP units were converted into 4CEP units by replacing the buffet car with a standard trailer converted from conventional locomotive-hauled coaching stock. Refurbished buffet cars had a small dining room, while a second class room, seating 24, took the place of the buffet.

4 TEP units 
Between 1983 and 1986, several 4 Big units required extensive refurbishment. To cover their workings, four temporary 4 TEP units were created, formed of three carriages from a refurbished CEP unit, with an unrefurbished buffet car from a BEP unit. The units were renumbered in the range 2701–2704. They were based at Brighton depot and operated mostly on the London to  line. The units were disbanded by 1986, once the refurbishment programme was complete, and were reformed as standard 4 CEP units. The unrefurbished buffet carriages were scrapped.

Unit formation are given below:

Final operations 
After rail privatisation in the mid-1990s, the different divisions of British Rail were divided up into different franchises.  The three former SR division; South-Eastern, South Central and South-Western; all operated 4 CEP units, and are dealt with separately here.

Connex South Central 
The South Central (SC) division, operated as Connex South Central, briefly operated 4 CEP units in the period 1995–1998.  Three standard units were converted to Class 411/6 by fitting them with high-speed Mk.6 motor bogies.  These units were renumbered into the series 1697–1699. They were chiefly employed on London Bridge to Brighton express services.  However, as the units were non-standard in the SC fleet, they were withdrawn and transferred to South West Trains.

South Eastern Trains 
The South Eastern (SE) division inherited the largest fleet of 4 CEP units. The franchise was originally operated by Connex South Eastern, but after Connex lost the franchise it became South Eastern Trains.  In 1996, when the franchise was awarded, a fleet of 85 standard units were in traffic. Many of these were quickly withdrawn from traffic, or transferred to the SW division. In early 1999, five units were converted to Class 411/9 3CEP units, with the removal of the second class open trailer. These removed trailers had not had so much work carried out on them at the time of refurbishment (as they were basically unchanged apart from cosmetic appearance and installation of hopper windows) and many had become severely corroded. This was necessary, as some stations could only accommodate 11 carriages. A further 13 units were later converted. The 3 CEP units were renumbered into the series 1101–1118.

The Connex fleet contained two 'celebrity' units. The first, no. 1592, was repainted by staff at Ramsgate depot into its original Green livery, to commemorate the final months in traffic for these units.  The second, no. 1602, was the only 4 CEP unit repainted into Connex livery, after it received derailment damage outside London Bridge station, and had to be repaired at Eastleigh works.  Both of these units were popular with railtours and excursion trains.

Withdrawal of units started in 1999, after they were replaced by new Class 375 'Electrostar' units. The original aim was to totally replace the 4 CEP fleet by 2000. However, poor reliability of the new units saw the 4 CEP's retained beyond this date. By the end of 2002, the fleet was again being reduced, with many standard units being sent to Immingham for scrap. The 3 CEP units were all withdrawn by March 2003, as units in traffic beyond this date had to be fitted with TPWS equipment. In the event, only seven units, nos. 1562, 1590, 1592, 1593, 1594, 1602 and 1615 were retained.

By the beginning of 2004, the seven units were withdrawn as they were due overhaul. They were replaced with units cascaded from South West Trains, which included the three Class 411/6 units. However, these units were themselves slowly retired, and it was expected the final units would have been withdrawn from service before the end of 2004. However, the Class 411/6 units were eventually withdrawn in July 2005, following the introduction of refurbished Class 465/9 "Networkers". Units 1697 and 1699 were sent for scrap, but 1698 was retained for working railtours. Due to a unit shortage It was later reinstated in August 2005, and remained in traffic until late September. It was one of three units to work a Ramsgate to Weymouth railtour, the others being 4 Cig 1866 and 4Vep 3545. Following this, it was quickly despatched for scrap.

South West Trains 
The South West (SW) division franchise was won by the Stagecoach Group and was operated as South West Trains (SWT). SWT did not inherit any standard 4 CEP units, but it did operate the seven 4 BEP units. However, in 1996, a shortage of trains led to SWT hiring two sets (nos. 1568 and 1589) on a short-term lease. These units were quickly followed by more, until by 1998, SWT had a fleet of 29 standard 4 CEP units. These were gradually overhauled, and were employed on a range of duties, including services to Portsmouth, Reading, Southampton, Bournemouth and Weymouth. Additionally, units commonly worked services on the Lymington branch.

The fleet stayed reasonably static until 2002, when SWT reformed several sets. The buffet cars from the 4 BEP units were inserted into seven standard units, which were renumbered 2321–2327 (reclassified as Class 412/2). The displaced carriages were inserted into the 4 BEP units, which were renumbered 2311–2317 (reclassified as Class 412/1). The reason behind this was that the 4 BEP units had faster acceleration, and the buffet cars were no longer used. Therefore, the reformations allowed a higher seating capacity in the faster units.

By 2003, SWT had ordered new trains, to replace all its slam door trains. These were designated Class 444 for express trains and Class 450 for suburban trains.  The first units to be replaced were the units in the 232x series, which were due for early withdrawal. Of the seven sets, one, set no. 2323, was withdrawn in 2002 due to fire damage, but was later converted back to a standard unit. Another, set no. 2326, was reduced to a 3 CEP, for operating the "Lymington Flyer" service on the Lymington branch, and was renumbered 1199. The remaining five units lasted until December 2003, when they were withdrawn. One, set no. 2325 was preserved, whilst the rest were scrapped.

The standard units lasted until early 2004, when they were either withdrawn and scrapped, or transferred to South Eastern Trains. One of the 4 BEP units, no. 2314, was converted into a 3CEP to replace no. 1199, and was renumbered 1198. Of the remaining six 4 BEP units, four were withdrawn in October 2004, leaving just two units remaining in traffic into 2005. The 3 CEP unit, no. 1198, was withdrawn at the end of December 2004, and was preserved by the EMU Preservation Society on the Dartmoor Railway before moving in 2008 to the Pontypool and Blaenavon Railway and then in 2013 to the Chinnor and Princes Risborough Railway. A replacement came in the form of 3Cig unit no. 1499. The final two 4 BEP units 2311 and 2315, soldiered on in traffic until withdrawal in March 2005. They were both later preserved at the Eden Valley Railway as 4Ceps.

Further use and departmental units 
Over the years, several unit have seen further use as departmental units. These are listed below:
7102 – Converted to Tractor Unit 932080. Scrapped in 1996
1500 – Converted to Tractor Unit 932081. Scrapped in 1996
1505 – Converted to Route-learning Unit 930082 for use by Southern, including removal of end-gangways. Later converted to static training unit at Selhurst depot. Sent for scrap in September 2005.
1512 – Used as a 3-car Tractor Unit by South West Trains at Bournemouth depot. Scrapped in June 2005 after being replaced by a Class 73 electro-diesel locomotive.
1545 – Converted to 3 car test unit 932545 and exported to Sweden. Converted to AC Overhead Line and DC Dual Voltage and was a test bed for IGBT and Adtranz Traction Package.  Scrapped there in 2002.
1620 – Converted to test unit 932620 for central door locking trials. Then used for paint trials at Eastleigh Works. Scrapped in November 2005.

Accidents and incidents 
On 4 January 1969, units 7181 and 7117 formed a passenger train that overran a signal in thick fog and ran into the rear of a parcels train near , Kent.
The driver of the lorry and the guard of the train were killed.
On 28 January 1993, unit 1521 overran the buffers at Ramsgate Depot, with one driving carriage left perched precariously above houses.

Preservation 
Four complete units have been saved for preservation.
4 BEP unit no. 2325 (containing 3 coaches of ex 1537, ex-7105) has been preserved by the EPB Preservation Group, is currently split in different locations with the centre cars being at the Epping Ongar Railway and the driving ends at Eastleigh Works. This set was the first of the production units to be built, and it is hoped to restore it to its original condition.  in January 2014, the two motor coaches were moved by road and rail to Eastleigh Works for this to begin. As of September 2016 one driving end is stripped and the other is in store.
3 CEP unit no. 1198 has been preserved by the EMU Preservation Society on the Chinnor and Princes Risborough Railway.  It was moved in May 2008 from the Dartmoor Railway to the Pontypool and Blaenavon Railway until August 2013, immediately prior to that railway's closure pending re-organisation. This unit was converted from former 4 BEP unit 2314 (ex-2304, ex 7175) for use on the Lymington Branch Line.
4 BEP units nos. 2311 and 2315 (which contains the other coach of 1537, ex-7105) are preserved on the Eden Valley Railway. These were the final two 4BEP units in service with South West Trains.
Both driving motor coaches from unit no. 1589 (ex-7178) are preserved on the Dartmoor Railway. Its TBC carriage can be found at Snibston Discovery Park in Leicestershire, and its TSO carriage was in now disbanded Cig 1393, at the Whitwell & Reepham railway station. 
The TBC 70345 from unit no. 1500 (ex-7153), which was also in 1547, is currently preserved In a Private Garden in Sutton Bridge.

The full list is shown below. Complete units are highlighted:

Fleet details 
Unrefurbished Units

Refurbished Units

Modelling 
Bachmann have released a 00 gauge model of the 4-CEP in 2009, with 4-BEP due out in mid 2021. An N Gauge version of the 4-CEP was released in late 2011 by Graham Farish.

Gallery

References

Further reading

External links 

EMU Preservation Society – owners of preserved set 1198.
EPB Preservation Group – owners of preserved set 2325.
Eden Valley Railway – owners of preserved sets 2311 and 2315.
Southern Electric Group – Kent Coast Electrification Scheme.
Southern Electric Group – Information on Class 411/412 and other EMUs.

411
Train-related introductions in 1956
750 V DC multiple units